Rhus glabra, the smooth sumac, (also known as white sumac, upland sumac, or scarlet sumac) is a species of sumac in the family Anacardiaceae, native to North America, from southern Quebec west to southern British Columbia in Canada, and south to northern Florida and Arizona in the United States and Tamaulipas in northeastern Mexico.

The leaves turn scarlet in the fall. The buds are small, covered with brown hair and borne on fat, hairless twigs. The bark on older wood is smooth and grey to brown.

In late summer it sometimes forms galls on the underside of leaves, caused by the parasitic sumac leaf gall aphid, Melaphis rhois. The galls are not harmful to the tree.

Uses
Native Americans ate the young sprouts as a salad. The fruit is sour and contains a large seed, but can be chewed (to alleviate thirst) and made into a lemonade-like drink. Deer forage the twigs and fruit. In 2020, archaeologists unearthed a pipe at a dig in Central Washington state, showing chemical evidence that a Native American tribe had smoked Rhus glabra either alone or in a blend with tobacco, perhaps "for its medicinal qualities and to improve the flavor of smoke."

References

External links
Bioimages: Rhus glabra
Smooth Sumac on eNature
Smooth Sumac of Kansas
Identifying Invasive Plants Detailed photos to distinguish Smooth Sumac from similar plants
Vegetation Management Guideline Control Recommendations
Non-tobacco plant identified in ancient pipe for first time

glabra
Flora of North America
Medicinal plants
Plants described in 1753
Taxa named by Carl Linnaeus